Adam Weiner (born March 28, 1975) is a former Polish handball goalkeeper, member of the Poland men's national handball team and silver medalist at the 2007 World Men's Handball Championship.

Sporting achievements

State awards
 2007  Gold Cross of Merit

References

1975 births
Living people
Polish male handball players
Sportspeople from Gdynia
Frisch Auf Göppingen players